Mghayreh (المغيري also spelled Mughayri) is a municipality in the Byblos District of  Keserwan-Jbeil Governorate, Lebanon. It is 82 kilometers north of Beirut. Mghayreh has an average elevation of 1,300 meters above sea level and a total land area of 263 hectares.  Its inhabitants are predominantly Maronite Catholics and Shia Muslims. Since the onset of the Syrian Civil War in March 2011, over 1.5 million Syrian refugees have fled to Lebanon, and constitute nearly one-fourth of the Lebanese population today.

Like other villages of Byblos District, Mghayreh knew the Persian, the Macedonian, the Seleucid, the Christian Byzantine, the Mamluk, and the Ottoman rules.  The mountainous territory of Byblos District, including Mghayreh has long been a shelter for minority and persecuted groups, including Maronite Christians and Shi’a ,Now  lot of Syrian refugees  live and work in the village.UNHCR has also distributed cash assistance to nearly 800,000 additional Syrian refugees and is working closely with host countries to ensure that refugees, internally displaced and stateless people are included in national responses to the pandemic as well as COVID-19 vaccination programs.

Mghayreh stands on the slopes of Joubbat El Mnaitra, South of Akoura, West of Afqa, and East of Qartaba, high up in the mountains of the Adonis River, now known as Nahr Ibrahim.  Mghayreh extends up to the plateau of Serghol . It is remarkable for the verdure of its landscapes, the abundance of its sources of water and the mildness of its climate. The source of water called 'Nabbeh  Beit Abou-salhab' is one of the most known spots in the village where inhabitants and visitors gather to fill water and meet. The source is used for irrigation along with drilling-wells in the village.

Mghayreh is known for its blue convent. The Yannouh Shrine dates back to the Phoenician period and is located halfway between Byblos (Byblos) and Heliopolis (Baalbek), which is similar to the Afqa temple, dedicated to the worship of Adonis and Esterot during the Roman era. (2nd century AD) The temple was dedicated to the goddess Diana, Jupiter's daughter. It has been wrongly cited as a temple that belongs to Yanouh village situated on the east side of Mghayreh and also known as lower Mghayreh. 
Patriarch Estephan Doueihi mentions that the monastery of Saint-Jeries-el-Azzra became the seat of the Maronite Patriarchate starting in 939.

The Church of Our Lady of Yanouh dates back to the Crusader period.

In a number of ecclesial and historical texts refer to the letter of Pope Innocent III to the Patriarch of Alexandria in 1216, and the letter of Pope Alexander IV to Patriarch Shimon in 1256, in which the Patriarchal Headquarters was mentioned in Yanouh. In 1277, the Patriarchal Headquarters moved to the Monastery of Our Lady Elijah in Mayfouq, Byblos district

Mghayreh is one of Byblos district villages, which produces many varieties of apples, and  thanks to its temperate climate in summer. The apple produced here is well known and in great demand, not only in Lebanon, but across the region alike. Varieties include the Golden and Star King apples.

Like other lush green villages of Byblos Mountain, Mghayreh grows apricots, plums, peaches, pears, pomegranates, berries, grapes and other fruits. But it is most famous for is its apples.

References

Populated places in Byblos District
Maronite Christian communities in Lebanon
Shia Muslim communities in Lebanon